Tumble is the ninth studio album by the experimental electronic music ensemble Biota, released in 1989 by ReR Megacorp.

Background
The album was commissioned by the ReR label for the purposes of "using the maximum available parameters offered" by the nascent compact disc recording medium.

Track listing

Personnel 
Adapted from the Tumble liner notes.

Biota
 Tom Katsimpalis – organ, guitar, bass guitar, banjo, harmonica, flute, cover art, design
 Mark Piersel – trumpet, guitar, bass guitar, banjo, sheng, psaltery, ukulele, recorder, balafon, organ, tape, engineering
 Steve Scholbe – alto saxophone, bass clarinet, flute, guitar, organ, autoharp, bells
 William Sharp – tape, engineering, design
 Gordon H. Whitlow – bass guitar, guitar, piano, organ, accordion, engineering
 Larry Wilson – drums, bongos, bodhrán, bells
 Randy Yeates – concertina

Additional musicians
 Deborah Fuller – violin (5)
 C.W. Vrtacek – piano and ukulele (9)
Production and additional personnel
 Biota – production, mixing, arrangements
 Mark Derbyshire – engineering
 Dick Kezlan – photography
 Richard Pena – engineering
 Bill Tindall – engineering

Release history

References

External links 
 Tumble at Discogs (list of releases)

1989 albums
Biota (band) albums
Recommended Records albums